"Don't Look Any Further" is a 1984 song by American singer Dennis Edwards featuring Siedah Garrett, and is written by Franne Golde, Dennis Lambert and Duane Hitchings. It is taken from the singer's debut album by the same name and peaked at No. 2 on the Billboard Black Singles chart and No. 72 on the Billboard Hot 100. In the UK, the song peaked at No. 45.

Guitar, bass and drum programming were by Paul Jackson, Jr.

Sampling
The recording is renowned for having been sampled by many prominent artists.

The 1986 single "City Lights" by William Pitt, which was a European hit, uses the same bassline and chord structure.
The first well-known sample of the song's distinctive bassline is in Eric B. & Rakim's 1987 single "Paid in Full".
2Pac's diss song "Hit 'Em Up", the B-side to his 1996 single "How Do U Want It", also samples "Don't Look Any Further".
R&B group TLC  sampled the song on the track "Das da Way Like 'Em", which was released and appeared on their 1992 debut album, Ooooooohhh... On the TLC Tip, and seven years later, the group also sampled the bassline on the remix of "Unpretty" under the title "Don't Look Any Further Remix" in 1999.
The Notorious B.I.G. and Junior M.A.F.I.A. also sampled "Don't Look Any Further" for their song "Gettin' Money (The Get Money Remix)."
Australian hip hop group The Herd sampled the bassline in their song, "77%".
Rob Base and DJ E-Z Rock also sampled the bassline in their song "Make It Hot".
Actress-singer Tichina Arnold sampled "Don't Look Any Further" for her song "Anyway You Wanna Be".
Lil Wayne sampled "Don't Look Any Further" on his 2002 single "Way of Life". It features Big Tymers and TQ and appears on his album 500 Degreez.
Houston rapper Z-Ro sampled the song in "Mo City Don (Freestyle)" off his album Let the Truth Be Told.
Rapper Snoop Dogg sampled the song in "New Jackson" (De Sean Jackson Theme Song) and in the song "Paper'd Up".
Aloe Blacc uses a simplified version of the bass in "Love Is the Answer".
Gospel duo Mary Mary sampled the replayed bass on their hit single "Shackles (Praise You)", produced by Warryn Campbell featured on their 2000 debut album, Thankful.

Music video
The low budget music video for the song has been described as "what ... might be the worst video ever".

It was shot on a soundstage in the Los Angeles/ Hollywood area.

Kane Gang version
In 1988, British blue-eyed soul/sophisti-pop group the Kane Gang took their version to number 52 on the UK Singles Chart, and number 64 on the Billboard Hot 100. Kane Gang's rendition of "Don't Look Any Further" was number one on the US dance charts for one week, and was their sole entry on the chart.

Track listing
 US 7-inch vinyl
A. "Don't Look Any Further"
B. "I Thought I Could Handle It"

M People version

British band M People released their cover of "Don't Look Any Further" in 1993, as the third single from their second album, Elegant Slumming (1993), released on November 22. The song peaked at number nine on the UK Singles Chart and number three on the UK Dance Singles Chart. In Iceland, "Don't Look Any Further" peaked at number two, while in New Zealand, it reached number four.

Composition and arrangement 
Lead singer Heather Small sings the lead part of the song which was originally sung by Dennis Edwards, while bandmate Mark Bell sings the part originally sung by Siedah Garrett. Small slightly alters the third line of the first verse: "What you need is a lover, someone to take over. Oh babe, don’t look any further" instead of singing: "What you need is lover, a man to take over. Oh girl, don’t look any further".

The M People version stayed very faithful to the original, giving the bassline the trademark deep Moog sound, and programming the drums with the same familiar bass drum beat. However, instead of the guitar in the middle eight, they used a saxophone.

Backing vocals are provided by British R&B gospel group Nu Colours.

Critical reception 
Andy Beevers from Music Week gave M People's cover of "Don't Look Any Further" four out of five. He wrote, "It is disappointing to find M People releasing a cover when their recent self-penned material has been strong. Their version of the Dennis Edwards classic sees them moving downtempo into soul rather than house territory. Although it is not as good as the original, the single should still sell well on both the strength of the outfit's growing reputation and the sheer quality of the composition."

Chart performance 
The song received very positive reception from critics, becoming the fourth consecutive top 10 hit for the band and their third consecutive top 10 from the Elegant Slumming album. It charted and peaked at number nine, spending five weeks in the top 20 with weekly sales starting at 82,000 copies and it continued to sell over 60,000 copies in each of the following four weeks.

The song spent a total of 10 weeks on the chart, leaving in early February 1994. "Don't Look Any Further" therefore had the second longest chart sojourn of any M People single, after the 11 weeks of both predecessor singles. In Iceland, the single reached number two. Elsewhere, they secured their second consecutive top 5 hit in New Zealand where it peaked at number four and stayed in the chart for 18 weeks. In Switzerland, it took the single seven weeks to peak at number 23, but stayed in the Swiss Top 40 for 18 weeks in total.

Music video 
The accompanying music video for "Don't Look Any Further" was directed by Jeff Baynes. The video was filmed over two days in Germany's capital of Berlin on October 26 and 27, 1993 while the band was still promoting "Moving On Up"'s success around Europe. Great landmarks including the Brandenburg Gate, the Berlin Wall, Marx-Engels Forum, Berlin Cathedral, the Kaiser Wilhelm Memorial Church and the Fernsehturm (the TV Tower in Alexanderplatz) are all featured within the video adding to the atmospheric backdrop seen in a misty haze. It was A-listed on Germany's VIVA in February 1994.

As the only second M People music video to be filmed abroad, the external shots show Small walking around the cold city centre as is also Mark Bell who is never seen singing with Small but they seem to pass each other at various points without realising while walking around town. Mike, Paul and Shovell are also seen chatting to each other under bridges, whilst Small seems oblivious to their existence.

Other internal shots show both Small and Bell leaning up against separate opposing walls and later are seen in a split-screen effect singing their duet but, again, never directly to each other. During the final chorus, Small is seated in a quiet German pub alone at a table at the fore and in the background, Mike, Paul and Shovell are seated around another table and they join in to sing the chorus. In this final scene, the camera continues to pan horizontally from right to left and back repeatedly as the four main members of the band all sing together.

Live performances 
During both legs of the Elegant Slumming tours, Mark Bell would continue to duet the song with Small. But on subsequent tours, the male lead would change: on the Bizarre Fruit tours, Small would duet with backing vocalist Paul Johnson. On the Fresco tour she'd sing with the late Lynden David Hall, who was also supporting them and Nate James would duet on the 2005 Re-union Tour, as he was supporting them. Other duets have been sung with backing vocalist Tommy Blaize after 2007.

Remixes 
The two mixes were provided by British house music producer (Dancing) Danny D (a.k.a. D Mob) who gave a funkier interpretation with additional backing vocals on the chorus whereas the similar-sounding "Strip to the Bone" mix (also by Danny D) gave the song a funkier version with an additional rap ad-lib of "the drum, the bass" to bridge the verse and chorus.

Artwork 
One of the four sofas as seen on the Elegant Slumming album cover is featured on the cover of this single on its own. It is this particular pink sofa that Heather Small was sat on on the cover of the parent album and her not being there incorporates the idea of "look(ing) no further" and finding no one there, in total contrast to the previous single "Moving On Up" when it was just a side profile of Small that made up the artwork.

Track listings 
 7" mini
 "Don't Look Any Further" (M People Master Edit) – 3:25
 "La Vida Loca" – 4:31

 12" maxi
 "Don't Look Any Further" (M People Master Mix) – 5:28
 "Don't Look Any Further" (Strip to the Bone Mix) – 5:26
 "Don't Look Any Further" (Danny D Mix) – 5:38
 "La Vida Loca" – 4:31

 CD maxi
 "Don't Look Any Further" (M People Master Edit) – 3:25
 "Don't Look Any Further" (Strip to the Bone Mix) – 5:26
 "Don't Look Any Further" (Danny D Mix) – 5.38
 "La Vida Loca" – 4:31

Charts

Weekly charts

Year-end charts

References

1984 songs
1984 singles
1988 singles
1993 singles
Deconstruction Records singles
Kane Gang songs
Motown singles
Quiet storm songs
Songs written by Franne Golde
Songs written by Dennis Lambert
Songs written by Duane Hitchings
Male–female vocal duets